Radomir Municipality is a municipality in the Pernik Province of Bulgaria.

Demography

At the 2011 census, the population of Radomir was 20,896. Most of the inhabitants were Bulgarians (88.47%) with a minority of Gypsies/Romani (4.27%). 6.94% of the population's ethnicity was unknown.

Villages
In addition to the capital town of Radomir, there are 9 villages in the municipality:

Baykalsko
Belanitsa
Boboratsi
Bornarevo
Chervena Mogila
Chukovets
Gorna Dikanya
Galabnik
Debeli lag
Dolna Dikanya
Dolni Rakovets
Dragomirovo
Dren
Drugan
Jedna
Jitusha
Izvor
Kasilag
Klenovic
Kondofrey
Kopanitsa
Kosharite
Negovantsi
Nikolaevo
Potsurnentsi
Priboy
Radibosh
Staro Selo
Stefanovo
Uglyartsi
Vladimir

References

Municipalities in Pernik Province